Relative Fear (also known as The Child and Le silence d'Adam) is a 1994 Canadian independent psychological horror film that references the 1956 film The Bad Seed. An autistic child is seemingly born to kill and does so.

Cast

Matthew Dupuis as Adam Pratman (Adam Madison)
Darlanne Fluegel as Linda Pratman
James Brolin as Det. Atwater
Martin Neufeld as Peter Pratman
Bruce Dinsmore as Clive (Gary Madison)
M. Emmet Walsh as Earl Ladelle
Michael Caloz as Manny Dorff
Denise Crosby as Connie Madison
Linda Sorenson as Margaret Ladelle
Jason Blicker as Dennison
Vlasta Vrána as Mr. Schulman
Liz MacRae as Ms. Roark
Gisèle Rousseau as Dr. Hoyer
Jenny Campbell as Paige
Frank Schorpion as Dr. Shane
Alan West as Henry Pratman
Victoria Barkoff as Ms. Smith
Tyrone Benskin as Cop
Roger E. Reid as Police Officer

Reception
In the book Representing Autism: Culture, Narrative, Fascination, Stuart Murray describes the film as "the worst kind of example of the prosthetic narrative, where the idea of disability simply becomes part of a genetic method". He states that there is "little recognizably autistic in anything Adam does"

References

External links

1994 films
1994 independent films
1990s psychological thriller films
1990s psychological horror films
Canadian independent films
Canadian psychological thriller films
Canadian psychological horror films
English-language Canadian films
Films about autism
1990s English-language films
Films directed by George Mihalka
1990s Canadian films